Nikita Andreev (born 12 September 2004) is a Russian freestyle skier. He competed in the 2022 Winter Olympics.

Career
Andreev won a gold medal at the 2021 Junior World Championships in the moguls event. He finished 27th out of 30 competitors in the first qualifying round in the men's moguls event at the 2022 Winter Olympics. After finishing in the top ten of the second qualifying round and the top 12 of the first final round, he failed to complete his run in the second final round, eliminating him from medal contention and the competition.

References

2004 births
Living people
Freestyle skiers at the 2022 Winter Olympics
Russian male freestyle skiers
Olympic freestyle skiers of Russia
Sportspeople from Saint Petersburg
21st-century Russian people